Skogås-Trångsunds FF is a Swedish football club located in Trångsund.

Background
Skogås-Trångsunds FF currently plays in Division 4 Stockholm Södra which is the sixth tier of Swedish football. They play their home matches at the Nytorps Mosse IP in Trångsund.

The club is affiliated to Stockholms Fotbollförbund.

Season to season

Footnotes

External links
 Skogås-Trångsunds FF – Official website
 Skogås-Trångsunds FF on Facebook

Football clubs in Stockholm
1993 establishments in Sweden